WDGR (1210 AM) is a defunct radio station formerly licensed to Dahlonega, Georgia, United States. The station was owned by Hye Cha Kim and featured a country music format with programming from Westwood One.

History
WDGR was founded by William S. Kinsland and Michael Hollifield (both residents of Dahlonega, Georgia), dba "Blue Ridge Radio Co. Inc." The first license applications were filed in 1977. After extensive litigation with competing applications, the initial Construction Permit was issued in 1981. The station went on the air as WAAH on March 1, 1982. Initially, the station operated on a frequency of 1520 kHz at an authorized power of 500 watts. On August 1, 1982, the station changed its call sign to the current WDGR. In October 1982, Kinsland sold his interest in the station to Kevin Croom.

The station's license was surrendered to the Federal Communications Commission (FCC) on November 5, 2018. At the time, WDGR had been off the air for significant periods of time since October 2007, due to what it described as financial and equipment-related issues. The FCC cancelled WDGR's license on November 7, 2018.

References

External link
FCC Station Search Details: DWDGR (Facility ID: 24459)

DGR
Radio stations established in 1982
1982 establishments in Georgia (U.S. state)
Defunct radio stations in the United States
Radio stations disestablished in 2018
2018 disestablishments in Georgia (U.S. state)
DGR
DGR